Hacienda View is an album by the English singer Linda Lewis, released in 1979. It was Lewis' seventh album. The album has been re-released as a standalone CD album in Japan only, but all the tracks are included in the Linda Lewis - Legends CD box set.

Track listing

Side One
"That's Love (Habanera)"
"Rolling for a While"
"The Best Days of My Life"
"109, Jamaica Highway"
"My Aphrodisiac is You"

Side Two
"Beggars and Kings"
"I'd Be Surprisingly Good For You"
"It Seemed Like A Good Idea At The Time"
"Save The Last Dance For Me"
"Sleeping Like A Baby"

References

Original record sleeve notes

1979 albums
Linda Lewis albums
Ariola Records albums